Moldskred is a Norwegian surname that may refer to the following notable people:
Lars Ivar Moldskred (born 1978), Norwegian football goalkeeper 
Matias Belli Moldskred (born 1997), Norwegian-Spanish football midfielder 
Morten Moldskred (born 1980), Norwegian football winger

Norwegian-language surnames